Bayaguana is a municipality (municipio) of the Monte Plata province in the Dominican Republic.

As of the Dominican Republic's 2002 census, the municipality had a total population of 34,786 inhabitants, of which 19,001 resided in urban areas and 15,785 in rural areas.

History
Bayaguana was founded in 1606, when Spain resettled colonists from the northern and western part of Hispaniola closer to Santo Domingo, under the government eviction programme known as the devastations of Osorio. Spanish colonists from La Yaguana and Bayajá (present-day Léogâne and Fort-Liberté, Haiti) were resettled in the town. The economy is centered on cattle-ranching and pineapple and rice farming.

Economy

It operates the agricultural line, as well as part of its land is sown with sugar cane, pineapple and natural pastures for food for the cattle that it has in abundance.

A site of great tourist attraction is located near the town of Bayaguana. It is the Salto de Comate, in the river of the same name, where hundreds of people flock every day to enjoy a bath in its cold waters. There are also the spas of Comatillo, in Comatillo, Salto Alto, in Sierra de Agua, among others. In turn, part of one of the main national parks, Los Haitises National Park, is located in Bayaguana.

Climate

References

Populated places in Monte Plata Province
Municipalities of the Dominican Republic
1606 establishments in the Spanish Empire